Datuk Lim Teong Kim (born 26 August 1963) is a Malaysian professional football coach and former player, who is recently appointed as head coach of Malaysian club Perak FC starting from 2023 season. He was formerly an assistant coach of Bayern Munich U19.

On 17 February 2022, IFFHS selected him on their list of Men’s All Time Malaysia Dream Team.

Career

Playing career 
The former midfielder, renowned for his ruthless streak, began his career with Malacca in 1983 before moving to Kuala Lumpur from 1984–1986.

He became the first Malaysian footballer to play in Europe when he signed for German club Hertha BSC in 1987. He only played for a single season in Germany before returning to Malaysia.

After returning from Germany, Lim signed and played for Kuala Lumpur, winning Malaysia Cup winner’s medals for a record three consecutive times from 1987-1989.

Apart from the stay in Berlin, Lim had a short trial with Austrian outfit, Grazer AK in 1990. His final outing as a player was for Kedah FA in 1993-1994.

With the Malaysia national team, he won the 1989 Southeast Asian Games gold medal. He scored the second goal in the 3–1 win over Singapore in the final. In total, Lim earned 60 international caps and scored 12 international goals for Malaysia.

Coaching career 
Lim's coaching stint with Bayern Munich Junior Team was from 2001 until 2011. 

He returned to Malaysia in August 2013 and signed a five-year contract with the Sports Ministry as the Project Director of National Football Development Programme (NFDP). Later in 2016, he was appointed as the Director of Mokhtar Dahari Academy (AMD), in a contract that was supposed to last until 2020. Syed Saddiq, the Minister of Youth and Sports Malaysia revealed that Lim was receiving a RM175,000 monthly salary package with tax exemption as the director of AMD. In September 2018, following the failure of the Malaysian B-16 squad to advance to the U-17 World Cup in Peru 2019, FAM held Lim responsible and terminated his service as coach with immediate effect.

On 13 September 2022, Lim was appointed head coach of Perak, which was in Malaysia's second division, the Malaysian Premier League, at that time.

Honours

Club
Malacca
 Malaysian League: 1983

Kuala Lumpur
 Malaysian League: 1988
 Malaysia Cup: 1987, 1988, 1989
 Malaysia Charity Shield: 1988

Kedah
 Malaysian League: 1993
 Malaysia Cup: 1993
 Malaysia Charity Shield: 1994

International
 SEA Games: 1989

Awards
  :
  Commander of the Order of the Territorial Crown (PMW) – Datuk (2023)

References 

1963 births
Living people
Malaysian sportspeople of Chinese descent
Malaysian footballers
Malaysia international footballers
Malaysian expatriate sportspeople in Germany
Expatriate footballers in Germany
Malaysian football managers
FC Bayern Munich non-playing staff
Kuala Lumpur City F.C. players
Malacca FA players
Negeri Sembilan FA players
Kedah Darul Aman F.C. players
Hertha BSC players
Malaysian expatriate footballers
People from Malacca
Southeast Asian Games bronze medalists for Malaysia
Southeast Asian Games gold medalists for Malaysia
Southeast Asian Games medalists in football
Association football midfielders
Competitors at the 1989 Southeast Asian Games